Jordan competed at the 2017 Asian Winter Games in Sapporo and Obihiro, Japan from February 19 to 26. The country's athletes competed in one sport: alpine skiing. Jordan's team consisted of two athletes (one male and one female).

Nasser Majali, the Jordan Olympic Committee's secretary general was the country's flagbearer during the parade of nations at the opening ceremony, due to both athletes still preparing elsewhere before their competitions began later in the week.

Background
Jordan originally did not enter any athletes at the close of entries in December 2016. However, the country was allowed to enter athletes after the deadline, after the Olympic Council of Asia extended an invite to the two skiers to compete, only a month before the games began.

Competitors
The following table lists the Jordanian delegation per sport and gender.

Alpine skiing

Jordan's alpine skiing team consisted of two athletes, one per gender.

References

Nations at the 2017 Asian Winter Games
Jordan at the Asian Winter Games
2017 in Jordanian sport